Filmography for Winston Sharples:

1933
 The Last Mail
 The Fatal Note
 Pals
 Croon Crazy
 The Rasslin' Match

1934
 Jest of Honor
 Sinister Stuff
 The Lion Tamer
 Jolly Good Felons
 Goode Knight
 Sultan Pepper
 How's Crops
 Wild Cargo
 A Royal Good Time
 Cubby's Stratosphere Flight
 Art for Art's Sake
 Mild Cargo
 Cactus King
 Fiddlin' Fun
 Grandfather's Clock
 Pastry Town Wedding
 Along Came a Duck
 Adventure Girl
 Little Bird Told Me
 The Parrotville Fire Department

1935
 Chinese Lanterns
 The Sunshine Makers
 Parrotville Old Folks
 Japanese Lanterns
 Spinning Mice
 The Picnic Panic
 The Merry Kittens
 The Foxy Terrier
 Parrotville Post Office
 Hunters Are Coming
 Scotty Finds a Home
 Bird Scouts
 Molly Moo-Cow and the Indians
 Molly Moo-Cow and the Butterflies
 Fang and Claw
 Molly Moo-Cow and Rip Van Wrinkle

1936
 Toonerville Trolley
 The Goose That Laid the Golden Egg
 Molly Moo Cow and Robinson Crusoe
 Neptune Nonsense
 Bold King Cole
 A Waif's Welcome
 Trolley Ahoy
 Cupid Gets his Man
 It's a Greek Life
 Toonerville Picnic

1938
 Magie africaine

1940
 Shakespearian Spinach
 Little Lambkin
 The Foul Ball Player
 Wimmen Is a Myskery
 The Ugly Dino
 Nurse-Mates
 Wedding Belts
 Fightin Pals
 Way Back When a Razzberry Was a Fruit
 Doing Impossikible Stunts
 The Fulla Bluff Man
 Wimmin Hadn't Oughta Drive
 Springtime in the Rock Age
 Popeye Meets William Tell
 My Pop, My Pop
 King for a Day
 Sneak, Snoop and Snitch
 The Constable
 Mommy Loves Puppy
 Bring Himself Back Alive

1941
 All's Well
 Zero, the Hound
 Two for the Zoo
 Olive's $weep$take Ticket
 Twinkletoes Gets the Bird
 Swing Cleaning
 Raggedy Ann and Raggedy Andy
 Sneak, Snoop and Snitch in Triple Trouble
 Popeye Meets Rip Van Winkle
 Olive's Boithday Presink
 Gabby Goes Fishing
 Copy Cat
 The Wizard of Arts
 Pest Pilot
 It's a Hap-Hap-Happy Day
 Vitamin Hay
 I'll Never Crow Again
 Superman
 Mechanical Monsters
 Nix on Hypnotricks

1942
 Billion Dollar Limited
 The Arctic Giant
 The Bulleteers
 The Raven
 Pip-eye, Pup-eye, Poop-eye an' Peep-eye
 Cactus Capers
 The Magnetic Telescope
 Olive Oyl and Water Don't Mix
 Many Tanks
 Electric Earthquake
 Volcano
 You're a Sap, Mr. Jap
 Terror on the Midway
 Alona on the Sarong Seas
 Japoteurs
 Showdown
 A Hull of a Mess
 Scrap the Japs
 Eleventh Hour
 Me Musical Nephews
 Destruction Inc.

1943
 Spinach Fer Britain
 Seein' Red, White 'n' Blue
 The Mummy Strikes
 Too Weak to Work
 Jungle Drums
 A Jolly Good Furlough
 Ration Fer the Duration
 The Hungry Goat
 Happy Birthdaze
 Wood-Peckin'
 No Mutton for Nuttin'
 Her Honor the Mare
 The Marry-Go-Round

1944-68

 1944 : Henpecked Rooster
 1944 : Hullaba-Lulu
 1944 : Cilly Goose
 1944 : Lulu Gets the Birdie
 1944 : We're On Our Way to Rio
 1944 : Suddenly It's Spring
 1944 : Lulu in Hollywood
 1944 : The Anvil Chorus Girl
 1944 : Lucky Lulu
 1944 : Spinach Packin' Popeye
 1944 : I'm Just Curious
 1944 : Moving Aweigh
 1944 : Lulu's Indoor Outing
 1944 : Yankee Doodle Donkey
 1944 : She-Sick Sailors
 1944 : Gabriel Churchkitten
 1945 : Pop-Pie a la Mode
 1945 : When G.I. Johnny Comes Home
 1945 : Magica-Lulu
 1945 : Tops in the Big Top
 1945 : Scrappily Married
 1945 : Beau Ties
 1945 : Shape Ahoy
 1945 : A Lamb in a Jam
 1945 : Daffidilly Daddy
 1945 : For Better or Nurse
 1945 : Snap Happy
 1945 : A Self-Made Mongrel
 1945 : Mess Production
 1945 : Man's Pest Friend
 1946 : Bargain Counter Attack
 1946 : Cheese Burglar
 1946 : Bored of Education
 1946 : House Tricks?
 1946 : Service with a Guile
 1946 : Loose in a Caboose
 1946 : Klondike Casanova
 1946 : Peep in the Deep
 1946 : Old MacDonald Had a Farm
 1946 : Sheep Shape
 1946 : Rocket to Mars
 1946 : Rodeo Romeo
 1946 : Chick and Double Chick
 1946 : Goal Rush
 1946 : Sudden Fried Chicken
 1946 : Spree for All
 1947 : Musica-Lulu
 1947 : The Fistic Mystic
 1947 : The Island Fling
 1947 : A Scout with the Gout
 1947 : Stupidstitious Cat
 1947 : Abusement Park
 1947 : The Enchanted Square
 1947 : I'll Be Skiing Ya
 1947 : Madhattan Island
 1947 : Much Ado About Mutton
 1947 : Cad and Caddy
 1947 : The Wee Men
 1947 : The Mild West
 1947 : The Royal Four-Flusher
 1947 : Popeye and the Pirates
 1947 : Naughty But Mice
 1947 : Wotta Knight
 1947 : A Bout with a Trout
 1947 : Safari So Good
 1947 : Super Lulu
 1947 : The Baby Sitter
 1947 : Santa's Surprise
 1947 : All's Fair at the Fair
 1947 : The Circus Comes to Clown
 1948 : Cat o'Nine Tails
 1948 : Olive Oyl for President
 1948 : The Dog Show-Off
 1948 : Flip-Flap
 1948 : Little Brown Jug
 1948 : Wigwam Whoopee
 1948 : The Golden State
 1948 : Winter Draws On
 1948 : We're in the Honey
 1948 : Pre-Hysterical Man
 1948 : The Bored Cuckoo
 1948 : There's Good Boos To-Night
 1948 : Land of the Lost
 1948 : Sing or Swim
 1948 : Popeye Meets Hercules
 1948 : Butterscotch and Soda
 1948 : A Wolf in Sheik's Clothing
 1948 : Camptown Races
 1948 : Spinach vs Hamburgers
 1948 : The Lone Star State
 1948 : Snow Place Like Home
 1948 : The Mite Makes Right
 1948 : Readin', Writin', and Rhythmetic
 1948 : Robin Hood-Winked
 1948 : Hector's Hectic Life
 1948 : The Old Shell Game
 1948 : Symphony in Spinach
 1949 : The Funshine State
 1949 : The Little Cut-Up
 1949 : Hep Cat Symphony
 1949 : The Emerald Isle
 1949 : Comin' Round the Mountain
 1949 : The Lost Dream
 1949 : Popeye's Premiere
 1949 : Shortenin' Bread
 1949 : Stork Market
 1949 : Little Red Schoolmouse
 1949 : Win, Place and Showboat
 1949 : A-Haunting We Will Go
 1949 : A Mutt in a Rut
 1949 : Lumberjack and Jill
 1949 : Spring Song
 1949 : The Ski's the Limit
 1949 : Hot Air Aces
 1949 : Heap Hep Injuns
 1949 : Campus Capers
 1949 : Toys Will Be Toys
 1949 : A Balmy Swami
 1949 : Gobs of Fun
 1949 : Farm Foolery
 1949 : Tar with a Star
 1949 : Our Funny Finny Friends
 1949 : Silly Hillbilly
 1949 : Marriage Wows
 1949 : Boos in the Night
 1949 : The Big Flame Up
 1949 : Leprechaun's Gold
 1949 : Barking Dogs Don't Fite
 1949 : Strolling Thru the Park
 1949 : Song of the Birds
 1949 : The Big Drip
 1949 : Snow Foolin'
 1949 : The Fly's Last Flight
 1950 : Mice Meeting You
 1950 : Land of the Lost Jewels
 1950 : Blue Hawaii
 1950 : How Green Is My Spinach
 1950 : Detouring Thru Maine
 1950 : Quack-a-Doodle Do
 1950 : Teacher's Pest
 1950 : Gym Jam
 1950 : Beach Peach
 1950 : Jingle, Jangle, Jungle
 1950 : Tarts and Flowers
 1950 : Ups an' Downs Derby
 1950 : Jitterbug Jive
 1950 : Pleased to Eat You
 1950 : Popeye Makes a Movie
 1950 : Goofy Goofy Gander
 1950 : Helter Swelter
 1950 : Saved by the Bell
 1950 : Baby Wants Spinach
 1950 : Cassino to Korea
 1950 : Quick on the Vigor
 1950 : Voice of the Turkey
 1950 : Casper's Spree Under the Sea
 1950 : Riot in Rhythm
 1950 : Fresh Yeggs
 1950 : Fiesta Time
 1950 : The Farmer and the Belle
 1950 : Once Upon a Rhyme
 1950 : Sock-a-Bye Kitty
 1951 : One Quack Mind
 1951 : Vacation with Play
 1951 : Tweet Music
 1951 : Mice Paradise
 1951 : Boo Hoo Baby
 1951 : Drippy Mississippi
 1951 : Thrill of Fair
 1951 : Hold the Lion Please
 1951 : Land of Lost Watches
 1951 : Miners Forty-Niners
 1951 : Alpine for You
 1951 : As the Crow Lies
 1951 : Too Boo or Not to Boo
 1951 : Double-Cross-Country Race
 1951 : Sing Again of Michigan
 1951 : Slip Us Some Redskin
 1951 : Pilgrim Popeye
 1951 : Boo Scout
 1951 : Party Smarty
 1951 : Casper Comes to Clown
 1951 : Cat-Choo
 1951 : Let's Stalk Spinach
 1951 : Audrey the Rainmaker
 1951 : Vegetable Vaudeville
 1951 : Cat Tamale
 1951 : Punch and Judo
 1951 : Casper Takes a Bow-Wow
 1951 : By Leaps and Hounds
 1951 : Scout Fellow
 1952 : Snooze Reel
 1952 : Popeye's Pappy
 1952 : Deep Boo Sea
 1952 : Off We Glow
 1952 : Lunch with a Punch
 1952 : Cat Carson Rides Again
 1952 : Ghost of the Town
 1952 : The Awful Tooth
 1952 : Fun at the Fair
 1952 : Swimmer Take All
 1952 : Law and Audrey
 1952 : Spunky Skunky
 1952 : Friend or Phony
 1952 : Dizzy Dinosaurs
 1952 : City Kitty
 1952 : Gag and Baggage
 1952 : Cage Fright
 1952 : Tots of Fun
 1952 : Clown on the Farm
 1952 : Popalong Popeye
 1952 : Pig-a-Boo
 1952 : Shuteye Popeye
 1952 : Mice-capades
 1952 : True Boo
 1952 : Forest Fantasy
 1952 : Big Bad Sindbad
 1952 : The Case of the Cockeyed Canary
 1952 : Feast and Furious
 1953 : Hysterical History
 1953 : Child Sockology
 1953 : Ancient Fistory
 1953 : Frightday the 13th
 1953 : Of Mice and Magic
 1953 : Starting from Hatch
 1953 : Spook No Evil
 1953 : Philharmaniacs
 1953 : Winner by a Hare
 1953 : Aero-Nutics
 1953 : Herman the Catoonist
 1953 : Popeye's Mirthday
 1953 : North Pal
 1953 : Better Bait Than Never
 1953 : Toreadorable
 1953 : Invention Convention
 1953 : By the Old Mill Scream
 1953 : Surf Bored
 1953 : Baby Wants a Battle
 1953 : No Place Like Rome
 1953 : Firemen's Brawl
 1953 : Little Boo-Peep
 1953 : Drinks on the Mouse
 1953 : Popeye, the Ace of Space
 1953 : Little Audrey Riding Hood
 1953 : Do or Diet
 1953 : Shaving Muggs
 1953 : Huey's Ducky Daddy
 1953 : Northwest Mousie
 1953 : Boos and Saddles
 1954 : Floor Flusher
 1954 : Boo Moon
 1954 : The Seapreme Court
 1954 : Crazy Town
 1954 : Keep Your Grin Up
 1954 : Surf and Sound
 1954 : Penny Antics
 1954 : Zero the Hero
 1954 : Popeye's 20th Anniversary
 1954 : Hare Today, Gone Tomorrow
 1954 : Gift for Gag
 1954 : Casper Genie
 1954 : Taxi-Turvy
 1954 : Candy Cabaret
 1954 : Of Mice and Menace
 1954 : Bride and Gloom
 1954 : Puss 'n' Boos
 1954 : Car-azy Drivers
 1954 : The Oily Bird
 1954 : Greek Mirthology
 1954 : Ship A-Hooey
 1954 : Fright to the Finish
 1954 : Boos and Arrows
 1954 : Fido Beta Kappa
 1954 : Private Eye Popeye
 1954 : Rail Rodents
 1954 : Boo Ribbon Winner
 1954 : A Job for a Gob
 1954 : Gopher Spinach
 1954 : No Ifs, and or Butts
 1955 : Cookin' with Gags
 1955 : Hide and Shriek
 1955 : Dizzy Dishes
 1955 : Nurse to Meet Ya
 1955 : Robin Rodenthood
 1955 : Git Along Li'l Duckie
 1955 : Bicep Built for Two
 1955 : Beaus Will Be Beaus
 1955 : Spooking with a Brogue
 1955 : News Hound
 1955 : Poop Goes the Weasel
 1955 : Bull Fright
 1955 : Mouse Trapeze
 1955 : Rabbit Punch
 1955 : Mister and Mistletoe
 1955 : Red White and Boo
 1955 : Cops Is Tops
 1955 : Mousieur Herman
 1955 : Boo Kind to Animals
 1955 : Kitty Cornered
 1956 : Hill-billing and Cooing
 1956 : Ground Hog Play
 1956 : Mouseum
 1956 : Sleuth But Sure
 1956 : Popeye for President
 1956 : Dutch Treat
 1956 : Swab the Duck
 1956 : Out to Punch
 1956 : Penguin for Your Thoughts
 1956 : Will Do Mousework
 1956 : Assault and Flattery
 1956 : Pedro and Lorenzo
 1956 : Mousetro Herman
 1956 : Insect to Injury
 1956 : Line of Screammage
 1956 : Parlez Vous Woo
 1956 : Sir Irving and Jeames
 1956 : Fright from Wrong
 1956 : I Don't Scare
 1956 : Hide and Peak
 1956 : A Haul in One
 1956 : Lion in the Roar
 1957 : Spooking About Africa
 1957 : Pest Pupil
 1957 : Nearlyweds
 1957 : Cat in the Act
 1957 : Hooky Spooky
 1957 : Fishing Tackler
 1957 : The Crystal Brawl
 1957 : Patriotic Popeye
 1957 : Peek a Boo
 1957 : Mr. Money Gags
 1957 : Sky Scrappers
 1957 : Spree Lunch
 1957 : L'Amour the Merrier
 1957 : Ghost of Honor
 1957 : Spooky Swabs
 1957 : From Made to Worse
 1957 : Ice Scream
 1957 : Possum Pearl
 1957 : Jumping with Toy
 1957 : Jolly the Clown
 1957 : Boo Bop
 1957 : One Funny Knight
 1957 : Cock-a-Doodle Dino
 1958 : Dante Dreamer
 1958 : Heir Restorer
 1958 : Sportickles
 1958 : Spook and Span
 1958 : Grateful Gus
 1958 : Frighty Cat
 1958 : Ghost Writers
 1958 : Finnegan's Flea
 1958 : Which Is Witch
 1958 : Okey Dokey Donkey
 1958 : Chew Chew Baby
 1958 : Travelaffs
 1958 : You Said a Mouseful
 1958 : Good Scream Fun
 1958 : Stork Raving Mad
 1958 : Right Off the Bat
 1958 : Dawg Gawn
 1959 : Owly to Bed
 1959 : Doing What's Fright
 1959 : The Animal Fair
 1959 : Fit to Be Toyed
 1959 : Felineous Assault
 1959 : La Petite Parade
 1959 : Fun on Furlough
 1959 : Houndabout
 1959 : Huey's Father's Day
 1959 : Down to Mirth
 1959 : Not Ghoulty
 1959 : Spooking of Ghosts
 1959 : Casper's Birthday Party
 1959 : Talking Horse Sense
 1959 : Matty's Funday Funnies (TV series)
 1959 : T.V. Fuddlehead
 1959 : Katnip's Big Day
 1959 : Out of This Whirl
 1960 : Top Cat
 1960 : Scouting for Trouble
 1960 : Mike the Masquerader
 1960 : Felix the Cat 
 1960 : Busy Buddies
 1960 : The Boss Is Always Right
 1960 : Be Mice to Cats
 1960 : Fiddle Faddle
 1960 : Trouble Date
 1960 : From Dime to Dime
 1960 : Trigger Treat
 1960 : Monkey Doodles
 1960 : Silly Science
 1960 : Peck Your Own Home
 1960 : The Shoe Must Go On
 1960 : Turning the Fables
 1960 : Shootin' Stars
 1960 : Electronica
 1960 : Counter Attack
 1960 : Space Conditioning
 1960 : Fine Feathered Fiend
 1960 : Disguise the Limit
 1960 : King Leonardo and His Short Subjects (TV series)
 1960 : Planet Mouseola
 1960 : Galaxia
 1960 : Bouncing Benny
 1961 : Terry the Terror
 1961 : Northern Mites
 1961 : Miceniks
 1961 : Phantom Moustacher
 1961 : The Lion's Busy
 1961 : The Kid from Mars
 1961 : The Mighty Termite
 1961 : Goodie, the Gremlin
 1961 : Alvin's Solo Flight
 1961 : In the Nicotine
 1961 : Hound About That
 1961 : Trick or Tree
 1961 : The Inquisit Visit
 1961 : Bopin' Hood
 1961 : Cape Kidnaveral
 1961 : Munro
 1961 : Cane and Able
 1961 : Turtle Scoop
 1961 : Kozmo Goes to School
 1961 : The Plot Sickens
 1962 : Without Time or Reason
 1962 : Perry Popgun
 1962 : Home Sweet Swampy
 1962 : Hi Fi Jinx
 1962 : Frog's Legs
 1962 : Crumley Cogwheel
 1962 : Popcorn and Politics
 1962 : Good and Guilty
 1962 : TV or Not TV
 1962 : Giddy Gadgets
 1962 : Funderful Suburbia
 1962 : Cool Cat Blues
 1962 : Psychological Testing
 1962 : Hero's Reward
 1962 : Snuffy's Song
 1962 : The Hat
 1962 : A Tree Is a Tree Is a Tree?
 1962 : The Method and Maw
 1962 : Koko Meets Boobnik (TV)
 1962 : Koko Gottum Injun Trouble (TV)
 1962 : Balloon Blues (TV)
 1962 : Take Me to Your Gen'rul
 1962 : Keeping Up with Krazy
 1962 : Et Tu Otto
 1962 : The Refriger-raider (TV)
 1962 : Pow-wow-wow! (TV)
 1962 : Polar Bear Facts (TV)
 1962 : Now You See It Now You Don't (TV)
 1962 : The Mystery Guest (TV)
 1962 : Mean Moe Means Well (TV)
 1962 : Love in Bloom (TV)
 1962 : Kokonut, Private Eye (TV)
 1962 : Knight Work (TV)
 1962 : Flying Saucery (TV)
 1962 : The Egg and Me (TV)
 1962 : Baby Face (TV)
 1962 : Yule Laff
 1962 : Penny Pals
 1962 : Mouse Blanche
 1962 : Robot Ringer
 1962 : It's for the Birdies
 1962 : Which Witch Is Which? (TV)
 1962 : Whale of a Story (TV)
 1962 : TV or Not TV (TV)
 1962 : That's Show Biz (TV)
 1962 : Success Story (TV)
 1962 : Reflection Land (TV)
 1962 : A Queen for a Day (TV)
 1962 : Mummy's the Word (TV)
 1962 : Moving Madness (TV)
 1962 : Mean Moe Takes Over (TV)
 1962 : Mean Moe's Money Mad (TV)
 1962 : Koko Roams in Rome (TV)
 1962 : Koko Meets Robin Hood (TV)
 1962 : In the Army (TV)
 1962 : Gigantical (TV)
 1962 : A Fishy Story (TV)
 1962 : Fastest Popgun in the West (TV)
 1962 : Comic Strip (TV)
 1962 : Bluebeard's Treasure (TV)
 1962 : The Big Bank Robbery (TV)
 1962 : A-Haunting We Will Go (TV)
 1962 : One of the Family
 1962 : Fiddlin' Around
 1963 : Ringading Kid
 1963 : Ollie the Owl
 1963 : The New Casper Cartoon Show (TV series)
 1963 : Wild West Story (TV)
 1963 : So Long Ceylon (TV)
 1963 : Rodeo (TV)
 1963 : On with the Show (TV)
 1963 : No Soap (TV)
 1963 : Medicine Man (TV)
 1963 : Mean Moe Rain Maker (TV)
 1963 : Mad Scientist Gets Madder (TV)
 1963 : Irving the Indian Nut (TV)
 1963 : Good Snooze Tonight
 1963 : Drum Up a Tenant
 1963 : Strictly from Lumber (TV)
 1963 : Station Breaks (TV)
 1963 : Sing Along with Moe (TV)
 1963 : The River Robbers (TV)
 1963 : Pony Express (TV)
 1963 : Plane Stupid (TV)
 1963 : Make Room for Moe (TV)
 1963 : The Invisible One (TV)
 1963 : Footloose Fox (TV)
 1963 : Extra Special Delivery (TV)
 1963 : Enchanted Prince (TV)
 1963 : A Dog Gone Snooper (TV)
 1963 : Comic Book Capers (TV)
 1963 : Arabian Daze (TV)
 1963 : A Sight for Squaw Eyes
 1963 : One Weak Vacation
 1963 : Trash Program
 1963 : You Are Here (TV)
 1963 : Sold On Manhattan (TV)
 1963 : Rocket Ranger (TV)
 1963 : Moe Moves In (TV)
 1963 : Mean Moe the Star (TV)
 1963 : Mean Moe the Great (TV)
 1963 : Mean Moe Gets the Bird (TV)
 1963 : Mean Moe and Cleopatra (TV)
 1963 : Koko Meets Barney Beatnik (TV)
 1963 : Koko in a London Fog (TV)
 1963 : Growing Pains (TV)
 1963 : The Fan Letter (TV)
 1963 : The Cliff Hanger (TV)
 1963 : Blunder Down Under (TV)
 1963 : Arty Party (TV)
 1963 : Who's Napoleon? (TV)
 1963 : The Unwashables (TV)
 1963 : Tic Tac Moe (TV)
 1963 : The Sleeping Beauty (TV)
 1963 : Sahara Today Gone Tomorrow (TV)
 1963 : Romance Machine Made (TV)
 1963 : Musketeer Moe (TV)
 1963 : Mean Moe the Lion Tamer (TV)
 1963 : Mean Moe Tells William Tell (TV)
 1963 : Mean Moe's Fairy Tale (TV)
 1963 : Mean Moe Day (TV)
 1963 : A Lot of Bull (TV)
 1963 : Let George Do It (TV)
 1963 : Jungle Bungle (TV)
 1963 : The Hillbillies (TV)
 1963 : Having a Hex of a Time (TV)
 1963 : Gone Hollywood (TV)
 1963 : Funnyland (TV)
 1963 : Fearless Female (TV)
 1963 : Bomb-y Weather (TV)
 1963 : Achilles Is a Heel (TV)
 1963 : Beetle Bailey and His Friends (TV series)
 1963 : Krazy Kat (TV series)
 1963 : Harry Happy
 1963 : Gramps to the Rescue
 1963 : Tell Me a Bedtime Story
 1963 : Sour Gripes
 1963 : The Pig's Feat
 1963 : Hound for Hound
 1963 : Hobo's Holiday
 1963 : Speak for Yourself Mean Moe (TV)
 1963 : Mean Moe's Side Show (TV)
 1963 : Mean Moe Cools Off (TV)
 1963 : Mayor Mean Moe (TV)
 1963 : Down to Earth (TV)
 1963 : The Sheepish Wolf
 1963 : Hiccup Hound
 1963 : Muggy-Doo Boycat
 1964 : Whiz Quiz Kid
 1964 : Goodie Good Deed
 1964 : Panhandling on Madison Avenue
 1964 : Sailing Zero
 1964 : Fizzicle Fizzle
 1964 : Fix That Clock
 1964 : Service with a Smile
 1964 : Robot Rival
 1964 : The Once Over
 1964 : Laddy and His Lamp
 1964 : A Friend in Tweed
 1964 : Ocean Bruise
 1964 : Highway Slobbery
 1964 : Call Me a Taxi
 1964 : Hip Hip Ole
 1964 : Accidents Will Happen
 1964 : Shoeflies
 1964 : Getting Ahead
 1964 : The Bus Way to Travel
 1964 : And So Tibet
 1965 : The Story of George Washington
 1965 : Reading, Writhing, and Rithmetic
 1965 : Near-Sighted and Far Out
 1965 : A Leak in the Dike
 1965 : A Tiger's Tail
 1965 : Homer on the Range
 1965 : Cagey Business
 1965 : Inferior Decorator
 1965 : A Hair-Raising Tale
 1965 : Poor Little Witch Girl
 1965 : The Itch
 1965 : Solitary Refinement
 1965 : Milton the Monster (TV series)
 1965 : Tally Hokum
 1965 : The Outside Dope
 1966 : Two by Two
 1966 : Trick or Cheat
 1966 : Throne for a Loss
 1966 : The Space Squid
 1966 : Potions and Notions
 1966 : Les Boys
 1966 : From Nags to Witches
 1966 : The Defiant Giant
 1966 : Baggin' the Dragon
 1966 : Alter Egotist
 1966 : I Want My Mummy
 1966 : Space Kid
 1966 : Sick Transit
 1966 : Op, Pop, Wham, and Bop
 1966 : A Wedding Knight
 1966 : A Balmy Knight
 1966 : Geronimo and Son
 1967 : Think or Sink
 1967 : High But Not Dry
 1967 : Halt, Who Grows There?
 1967 : From Orbit to Obit
 1967 : Forget-Me-Nuts
 1967 : Clean Sweep
 1967 : Brother Bat
 1967 : Blacksheep Blacksmith
 1967 : My Daddy the Astronaut
 1967 : The Trip
 1967 : The Squaw Path
 1967 : The Plumber
 1967 : Robin Hoodwinked
 1967 : The Stuck-Up Wolf
 1967 : The Stubborn Cowboy
 1967 : A Bridge Grows in Brooklyn
 1967 : Batfink: This Is Your Life (TV)
 1967 : The Opera Caper
 1967 : Marvin Digs
 1968 : The Mini Squirts
 1968 : Keep the Cool Baby
 1968 : Mouse Trek
 1968 : The Go-Go Gophers (TV series)
 2004 : Felix the Cat Saves Christmas (video)

Sharples, Winston